Pemmasani Nayaks were a ruling clan in the south Indian state of Andhra Pradesh. They came into prominence during Vijayanagara times as rulers of Gandikota over 300 years. After the Battle of Talikota in 1565 AD, the collapse of Vijayanagara Empire led to the emergence of Pemmasani Nayakas in the Rayalaseema region. They belonged to the Kamma social group.

Origin
According to Yadiki Kaifiat, Vijayanagara Emperor Phrauda Deva Raya granted Nayankarship of Yadiki to Pemmasani Timma Nayaka in 1424 - 1444 AD period marking the beginning of the rule of Pemmasani Nayakas. According to Tadipatri Kaifiat, Vijayanagara Emperor Sri Krishna Deva Raya granted Nayankarship of Tadipatri to Pemmasani Timma Nayaka between 1509 - 1529 AD period marking the beginning of the rule of Pemmasani Nayakas. After the collapse of Vijayanagara Empire in 1565 at the battle of Tallikota, Pemmasani Nayakas ruled Gandikota, Yadiki, Gutti and Tadipatri estates for over 100 years from 1565 to 1685. According to Historian Yadlapalli Amarnath, Pemmasanis influence on Gandikota Fort was very high which is evident from a inscription belonging to 16th century which mentioned Gandikota as Kamma Durgam (Kammas Fort).

Sources
Pemmasani Nayaks are known to be the feudatory rulers of Gandikota in the sixteenth century, serving under Aravidu dynasty (1542–1652), especially Aliya Rama Raya. The late sixteenth century Telugu text Rayavachakamu mentions Pemmasani Ramalinga Nayudu as a Kamma chief serving Krishnadeva Raya. It is not known whether he served Krishnadeva Raya or some later ruler.

Extent of rule 
The Pemmasani Nayaks ruled Yadiki, Gooty Tadipatri and Gandikota. The maximum extent of Pemmasanis feudatorial influence ranged from Gandikota to Kondapalli during the reign of Pemmasani Ramalinga Nayaka which includes areas like Gooty, Kondaveedu, Bellamkonda, Kanchi, Tadipatri, Yadaki. Pemmasanis helped Araveeti kings to ascend the throne of great Vijayanagar Empire when there was power shift between Tuluva and Araveedu dynasties after the Battle of Tallikota in 1565 A. D. where the Vijayanagar empire under Tuluva dynasty rule faced huge defeat against combined forces of Deccan Sultanates. Pemmasanis played a crucial role in protecting the Vijayanagar empire. This is evident from the prime location of land that Vijayanagar kings have provided to Pemmasanis in Hampi as camp when they visited the city.

Rule
The first ruler of Pemmasani clan was Pemmasani Timmanayudu who fought many a battle and won the trust of Bukka Raya.

Veera Thimma had a son by name Chennappa who had two sons Ramalinga Naidu and Peda Thimma Naidu. Ramalinga ruled Gandikota (1509-1530 CE) during the time of Krishna Deva Raya. Ramalinga had 80,000 soldiers under him and he played a crucial role in the victory of Krishna Deva Raya over the combined armies of Kalaburagi, Golkonda and Ahmednagar. His exploits in the battle were extolled by many Telugu poets. He was the most feared by the Generals of Bijapur, Ahmednagar and Golconda.

Thimma Naidu II participated in the expeditions of Krishna Deva Raya and captured Udayagiri, Addanki, Kondapalli, Rajahmundry and Katakam (Cuttack). He also played a crucial role in the conquest of Ummattur.

After the death of Krishna Deva Raya in 1529, his son-in-law Rama Raya took control of the kingdom. The Bahamani sultan colluded with Salakam Timmaraja and raided Vijayanagar. Ramaraya took refuge in Gandikota. Bangaru Thimma Naidu vanquished Bahamanis in a fierce battle at Komali, killed Salakam Timmaraja and restored the throne to Ramaraya.

Kuruvikulam 
After the battle of Talikota, one section of Gandikota Pemmasani family migrated to Tamil Nadu and established Kuruvikulam Zamindari. This is the most prominent Zamindari estate in Tamil Nadu. It existed from 1565 to 1949.

See also 
Gandikota
Kamma
Pemmasani Ramalinga Nayaka
Pemmasani Timma Nayaka
Kuruvikulam

References

Bibliography
  

Dynasties of India
History of Andhra Pradesh
Telugu monarchs